The Egypt International is an international badminton tournament held in Cairo, Egypt. The event is part of the Badminton World Federation's Future Series and part of the Badminton Confederation of Africa's Circuit.

Past winners

Performances by nation

References

External links

Badminton tournaments in Egypt
2015 establishments in Egypt